The Santa Fe Arroyo Seco Railroad Bridge in Highland Park, Los Angeles, is more than  long and crosses the Arroyo Seco Parkway at an elevation of over . It is the tallest and longest railroad span in the city of Los Angeles, and most likely the oldest such structure still in use.
The bridge crosses the lower part of the Arroyo Seco, a watershed canyon from the San Gabriel Mountains.

The Santa Fe Arroyo Seco bridge, built in 1896, replaced the 1889 wooden trestle used by the Southern California Railway, which was a subsidiary of the Santa Fe Railroad. The 1889 bridge, designed by Santa Fe's chief structural engineer Fred T. Perris, replaced the original 1885 wooden trestle bridge built by the Los Angeles and San Gabriel Valley Railroad. Rail service ended in 1994 and in the late 1990s, the bridge was retrofitted to accommodate the Los Angeles MTA's Gold Line light rail system which opened on July 26, 2003.

Advocated by the Highland Park Heritage Trust and Charles J. Fisher, the bridge was declared City of Los Angeles Historic-Cultural Monument No. 339 on January 22, 1988.

See also
List of bridges documented by the Historic American Engineering Record in California
List of Los Angeles Historic-Cultural Monuments on the East and Northeast Sides
List of Registered Historic Places in Los Angeles
History of Trains in Pasadena	
Southern Transcon
Union Station (Los Angeles)
Southwest Chief
Atchison, Topeka and Santa Fe Railway
Highland Park (Los Angeles Metro station)
South Pasadena (Los Angeles Metro station)

References

External links 

Bridges in Los Angeles County, California
Railroad bridges in California
Arroyo Seco (Los Angeles County)
Highland Park, Los Angeles
Steel bridges in the United States
Bridges completed in 1896
1896 establishments in California
Los Angeles Historic-Cultural Monuments
Historic American Engineering Record in California
Trestle bridges in the United States
L Line (Los Angeles Metro)